The International Film Music Critics Association (IFMCA) is a professional association for online, print and radio journalists who specialize in writing about original film and television music.

History and purpose
The IFMCA was founded in the late 1990s as the Film Music Critics Jury by film music journalist Mikael Carlsson (now the owner of film music record label MovieScore Media), and after period of inactivity was re-launched in 2003 under its new title.

Its membership includes 65 journalists from 16 different countries who write for such high-profile film and soundtrack-related publications and websites as Film Score Monthly, Filmtracks, SoundtrackNet, Music from the Movies, MundoBSO and UnderScores, as well as more mainstream publications such as Ain't It Cool News, Variety, The Hollywood Reporter and the Irish Times. Members of the IFMCA have also been involved in writing liner notes for major film music record labels such as Film Score Monthly, Varèse Sarabande, Intrada Records, La-La Land Records and Music Box Records.

The group maintains a website documenting its activities; operates a central online review interface which provides links to articles, reviews and interviews written by its members; organizes an annual awards event, the IFMCA Awards, celebrating music for films written during the preceding year; and is involved in organizing major international film music festivals, such as those in Tenerife, Úbeda in Spain, Kraków in Poland, and the World Soundtrack Awards in Ghent, Belgium.

IFMCA Awards
The organization is responsible for the annual International Film Music Critics Association Awards, the only awards given to composers by active film music journalists, and which are seen by many as a valuable precursor to the Academy Awards in the absence of a guild for composers. They have been called the "Oscars of film music", have been featured in major daily newspapers in Spain and Portugal, are recognized by major performing rights organizations such as ASCAP in the United States and SGAE in Europe, and most recently have been seen by the video games industry as an important step forward in legitimizing game music as a mainstream creative art form.

Composers as varied as John Debney, Alexandre Desplat, Randy Edelman, George Fenton, Michael Giacchino, James Newton Howard Mark Isham, Andrew Lockington, Abel Korzeniowski, Brian Tyler, Fernando Velázquez and Debbie Wiseman highlight their IFMCA Award wins and nominations in their official biographies.

References

External links
International Film Music Critics Association home

Film critics associations
Music criticism
Internet film festivals
Awards established in 2004